Hudymenko, also transliterated Gudymenko, is a Ukrainian surname. Notable people with the surname include:

 Yurii Hudymenko (born 1987), Ukrainian politician
 Yuriy Hudymenko (born 1966), Ukrainian footballer

See also
 

Ukrainian-language surnames